Moon Jin-ju is a South Korean wrestler who participated at the 2010 Summer Youth Olympics in Singapore. She won the silver medal in the girls' freestyle 70 kg event, losing to Dorothy Yeats of Canada in the final.

References 

Wrestlers at the 2010 Summer Youth Olympics
South Korean wrestlers
South Korean female sport wrestlers
Living people
Year of birth missing (living people)
21st-century South Korean women